The 2016 Winnipeg National Bank Challenger was a professional tennis tournament played on outdoor hard courts. It was the 1st edition, for men, and 4th edition, for women, of the tournament and part of the 2016 ATP Challenger Tour and the 2016 ITF Women's Circuit, offering totals of $75,000, for men, and $25,000, for women, in prize money. It took place in Winnipeg, Manitoba, Canada between July 11 and July 17, 2016.

Men's singles main-draw entrants

Seeds

1 Rankings are as of June 27, 2016

Other entrants
The following players received wildcards into the singles main draw:
 Félix Auger-Aliassime
 Kevin Kylar
 Brayden Schnur
 Benjamin Sigouin

The following player entered the singles main draw with a protected ranking:
 Blaž Kavčič

The following players received entry from the qualifying draw:
 Dayne Kelly 
 James McGee 
 Cameron Norrie
 Aleksandar Vukic

Women's singles main-draw entrants

Seeds

1 Rankings are as of June 27, 2016

Other entrants
The following players received wildcards into the singles main draw:
 Bianca Andreescu
 Isabelle Boulais
 Marie-Alexandre Leduc
 Carol Zhao

The following players received entry from the qualifying draw:
 Jessie Aney
 Francesca Di Lorenzo
 Jessica Failla
 Catherine Leduc
 Erin Routliffe
 Kennedy Shaffer
 Kristina Smith
 Ronit Yurovsky

Champions

Men's singles

 Go Soeda def.  Blaž Kavčič, 6–7(4–7), 6–4, 6–2

Women's singles

 Francesca Di Lorenzo def.  Erin Routliffe, 6–4, 6–1

Men's doubles
 
 Mitchell Krueger /  Daniel Nguyen def.  Jarryd Chaplin /  Benjamin Mitchell, 6–2, 7–5

Women's doubles

 Francesca Di Lorenzo /  Ronit Yurovsky def.  Marie-Alexandre Leduc /  Charlotte Robillard-Millette, 1–6, 7–5, [10–6]

External links
Official website

Winnipeg National Bank Challenger
Winnipeg National Bank Challenger
Winnipeg Challenger
Winnipeg National Bank Challenger